Hernandia drakeana was a species of plant in the Hernandiaceae family. It was endemic to French Polynesia.

References

Hernandiaceae
Flora of French Polynesia
Extinct flora of Oceania
Plant extinctions since 1500
Taxonomy articles created by Polbot